Sambu may refer to:

Sambu Kingdom, ancient kingdom in Angola
Sambu, Estonia, village in Jõelähtme Parish, Harju County, Estonia
Sambu Island, island in Riau Islands Province, Indonesia
Sambú, Panama
Sambavar, A Dravidian community

See also
Sanbu, Chiba, town in Sanbu District, Chiba, Japan
Sambuvaraya, an ancient kingdom of south India.